Srirampur Colony is a major suburb in Naspur town in Mancherial district in the Indian state of Telangana.

References

Villages in Mancherial district